Bataafse Petroleum Maatschappij or  Bataafsche Petroleum Maatschappij (colloquially known as BPM), Dutch for Batavian Oil Company, was the Dutch East Indies and later Indonesian subsidiary of Royal Dutch Shell oil company established in 1907.

History

The BPM was established in 1907. It was Shell's main oil producing entity in Indonesia (at that time, Dutch East Indies) and dominated the Indonesian oil industry during the colonial era, making it one of the largest companies in the colonial economy. The main oil well of BPM was Pangkalan Brandan (North Sumatra), which is considered as the origin of the Royal Dutch Shell. More than 95% of Indonesia's crude oil was commercially produced by BPM in the 1920s.

The dual-listed nature of the Royal Dutch Shell meant that BPM was 60 percent owned by the Royal Dutch Petroleum Company, and 40% by the Shell Transport and Trading Company; it acted as a Dutch holding company for the merged Royal Dutch Shell Group along with its UK analogue the Anglo-Saxon Petroleum Company. The two were merged in 2005 creating a single holding structure for Shell.

After the Japanese occupation of Indonesia, Shell's original well at Pangkalan Brandan was taken over by the Indonesian army. In 1957, Pangkalan Brandan became the main asset of the newly formed Indonesian oil company, Permina, the predecessor of Pertamina. In the 1950s, US oil giants Caltex (now Chevron) and Stanvac (now ExxonMobil) invested heavily in Indonesia, dropping the share of BPM to only 34% in 1957, compared to 46% for Caltex and 20% for Stanvac. Eventually, Shell pulled out of Indonesia in 1965 and would only re-enter (in distribution only) in the early 2000s.

See also
Pertamina
Royal Dutch Shell

References

Cited works

External links
 

Defunct oil companies
Shell plc
Dutch East Indies
Defunct energy companies of Indonesia
Defunct energy companies of the Netherlands